Dame Avril Anne Barker Poole DBE, RGN, RM, RHV, CBIM (born 11 April 1934), known as Anne Poole, is a former British civil servant who was Chief Nursing Officer for England at the Department of Health, from 1982 to 1992.

On 27 January 1997 she was named to serve on the Criminal Injuries Compensation Appeal Panel.

She resides in Ancaster House, Church Hill, Merstham, Surrey.

References

Further reading

External links
New Year's Honours List, london-gazette.co.uk. 30 December 1991.
 Reference, publications.parliament.uk. Accessed 31 December 2022.

 Reference to Dame Anne Poole, NursingTimes.net, 27 May 2008.

1934 births
Living people
NHS Chief Professional Officers
English nurses
British nursing administrators
Dames Commander of the Order of the British Empire
People from Surrey
Place of birth missing (living people)